The Henry River is a minor river in the South Island of New Zealand.

The headwaters are in the Spenser Mountains. The Anne River is a tributary. The river flows east for  before flowing into the Waiau Uwha River.

Rivers of Canterbury, New Zealand
Rivers of New Zealand